Kerry Raymond Bolton (born 1956) is a white supremacist and holocaust denier, and a published author and political activist on those subjects. He is involved in several nationalist and fascist political groups in New Zealand.

Political activism
In 1980, Bolton co-founded the New Zealand branch of the Church of Odin, a pro-Nazi organisation for "whites of non-Jewish descent". He has published and edited newsletters such as The Watcher, The Flaming Sword, The Heretic, The Nexus, Ab Aeterno (assistant editor) and Western Destiny. He founded the national-socialist Order of the Left Hand Path (OLHP) in 1992, following a quarrel with other members of the Temple of Set. Two years later it was renamed the Ordo Sinistra Vivendi ("Order of the Left Way"), and in the same year created the fascist Black Order. It claimed to have a network of national lodges in six European countries plus Australia and the U.S. It was intended to be an activist front promoting an "occult-fascist axis" by mobilising political groups and youth culture elements such as industrial music. Bolton created and edited the Black Order newsletter, The Flaming Sword, and its successor, The Nexus, a satanic-Nazi journal with special attention given to figures such as Savitri Devi, Julius Evola, and Ezra Pound, and which especially catered to the black metal movement. It later changed its name to Western Destiny. In 1996, Bolton formed The Thelemic Society which blended rightist politics with the teachings of the English occultist Aleister Crowley and the philosophy of the German thinker Friedrich Nietzsche.

Bolton was a co-founder of the Nationalist Workers' Party, and was briefly secretary for the New Zealand Fascist Union in 1997, in which he promoted the 'patriotic socialism' of 1930s Labour hero John A. Lee. In 2004 he was the secretary of the New Zealand National Front and spokesman for the New Right group. He was also involved with the New Zealand National Front but resigned because of disputes with neo-Nazi and white supremacist factions. In 2021, the University of Otago student magazine Critic Te Ārohi reported that Bolton is in regular contact with the white supremacist organisation Action Zealandia.

Controversies

In 2008, a masters thesis written about Bolton published by the Waikato University was temporarily pulled from the library pending investigation after Bolton complained to the vice-chancellor. The thesis, titled "Dreamers of the Dark: Kerry Bolton and the Order of the Left Hand Path; a Case-study of a Satanic/Neo Nazi Synthesis", dealt with the link between neo-Nazi and satanic beliefs in New Zealand. It had been passed by the university, had been reviewed by senior academics from two other universities, and had received full class honors. Professor Dov Bing, who supervised the thesis, called it a first-class piece of work. Bolton claimed the thesis was "poorly researched" and was "a poorly contrived smear-document against a private individual, namely myself". After criticism from the Tertiary Education Union, Vice Chancellor Crawford issued a one-page letter stating that the thesis was sound because it had been externally examined by "two well qualified academics".

In December 2009, Bolton filed a complaint with the Broadcasting Standards Authority concerning the Ideas programme on Radio New Zealand National, which featured Marxist poet and sociologist Scott Hamilton. Hamilton had stated that Bolton was an avid "holocaust denier", had a "close relationship" with the revisionist Adelaide Institute, insinuated himself into the anti-war movement where he made anti-Semitic and "holocaust denial" statements, and exercised a bad political influence over "unwary youth". Bolton claimed that all of Hamilton's allegations were incorrect. The Broadcasting Standards Authority initially upheld Bolton's complaint on all grounds, and criticised Radio New Zealand for not having verified the accuracy of Hamilton's statements before broadcasting the programme, but reversed this decision in December 2010 and declined to uphold any of Bolton's complaints.

In December 2009, Bolton complained to the Press Council against a lengthy feature article run by The Press, Christchurch, "A Right Muddle" by John McCrone. Bolton stated that the article wrongly stated that Bolton was a "neo-Nazi Satanist", that he was associated with "white power" and "pseudo-fascist views", that he was the founder of New Right New Zealand, among other matters. The Press Council in a ruling dated for release as 26 March 2010, upheld parts of the complaint, determining that the article is "inaccurate and biased".

In a revised preface to Phoenix Rising: The Epic Saga of James H. Madole republished in 2006, Bolton wrote about his past involvement in the occult and was critical of occultism, writing that "it is clear that Madole was waylaid by a belief in Theosophy and other occult paths which influenced the doctrines and policy of the NRP... I merely want to offer testimony that Jesus Christ is the central figure of Western civilisation, and Christianity its basis...the fight for the West is the fight for Christ".

Other activities 

In 2014, Bolton was involved in a campaign seeking (unsuccessfully) to save a young dog from euthanasia for allegedly nipping another dog on the hind leg in the course of play. The dog was euthanised two days early after threats on Facebook of violence against council staff members.

In 2019, he appeared in court for breaching the name suppression of a sexual assault victim in 2018 on a radio show. Bolton was discharged without conviction by Porirua District Court judge Ian Mill on Thursday said the discharge was conditional on him paying reparation of $1500 to the victim within a month. Police prosecutor Sergeant Paul Macky said it was inconceivable that he did not know about the suppression.

Published works 
 Dietrich Eckart: Hitler's Occult Mentor (Renaissance Press, 1995)
 Lovecraft's Fascism: The Political Views of H.P. Lovecraft (Renaissance Press, 1995)
 Phoenix Rising: The Epic Saga of James H. Madole (Renaissance Press, 1996)
 Aleister Crowley and the Conservative Revolution: Social and Political Thoughts of the Great Beast (Renaissance Press, 1996)
 Thelema Invictus (Renaissance Press, 1996)
 The Warrior Mage: General J.F.C. Fuller (Renaissance Press, 1996)
 Origins & Varieties of Fascism: A Pictorial History (Renaissance Press, 1997)
 Rudolf Steiner & the Mystique of Blood & Soil (Renaissance Press, 1999)
 The Holocaust Myth: A Sceptical Enquiry (Spectrum, 2000)
 The Kosher Connection: Drugs, Israel, Gangsters & Zionism (Renaissance Press, 2002)
 Thinkers of the Right: Fascism, Nationalism & Elitism Amongst the Literati (Luton Publications, 2002)
 Portraits & Principles of World Fascism (Renaissance Press, 2003)
 Mel Gibson & the Pharisees (Renaissance Press, 2003)
 Nazism?: An Answer to the Smear-Mongers (Renaissance Press, 2005)
 The Faith of Europe (Spectrum Press, 2009)
 Otto Strasser's "New Europe" (Renaissance Press, 2011)
 Revolution from Above (Arktos Media, 2011)
 Artists of the Right (Counter-Currents, 2012)
 The Parihaka Cult (Black House Publishing, 2012)
 Stalin: The Enduring Legacy (Black House Publishing, 2012)
 Geopolitics of the Indo-Pacific (Black House Publishing, 2013)
 The Psychotic Left: From Jacobin France to the Occupy Movement (Black House Publishing, 2013)
 The Banking Swindle (Black House Publishing, 2013)
 Babel Inc. (Black House Publishing, 2013)
 Perón and Perónism (Black House Publishing, 2014)
 Zionism, Islam and the West (Black House Publishing, 2015)
 Religion, Mysticism and the Myth of the "Occult Reich" (Inconvenient History, 2015)
 Opposing the Money Lenders: The Struggle to Abolish Interest Slavery (Black House Publishing, 2016)
 The Occult and Subversive Movements: Tradition & Counter-Tradition in the Struggle for World Power (Black House Publishing, 2017)
 The Decline and Fall of Civilisations (Black House Publishing, 2017)
 More Artists of the Right (Counter-Currents, 2017)
 Russia and the Fight Against Globalisation (Black House Publishing, 2018)
 The Perversion of Normality: From the Marquis de Sade to Cyborgs (Arktos Media Ltd, 2021)

See also 
 Fascism in New Zealand

References 

1956 births
Living people
New Zealand activists
New Zealand National Front politicians
New Zealand writers
New Zealand occultists
Satanism and Nazism